Harry O'Neill may refer to:
Harry P. O'Neill (1889–1953), U.S. Representative from Pennsylvania
Harry O'Neill (One Life to Live), a character from the soap opera One Life to Live 
Harry O'Neill (pitcher) (1892–1969), Major League Baseball pitcher, 1922–1923
Harry O'Neill (catcher) (1917–1945), Major League Baseball player killed in World War II
Harry O'Neill (footballer, born 1894), English footballer for The Wednesday, Bristol Rovers and Swindon Town
Harry O'Neill (footballer, born 1908), English footballer for Cardiff City

See also
Henry O'Neill (disambiguation)
Harold O'Neill (disambiguation)